Music From the Original Motion Picture Soundtrack Dangerous Ground is the original soundtrack to Darrell Roodt's 1997 action thriller film Dangerous Ground. It was released on February 11, 1997 via Jive Records, and entirely composed of hip hop music songs. The album peaked on the US Billboard charts at number 20 on the Billboard 200 and number 3 on the Top R&B/Hip-Hop Albums, and spawned two singles: "The World Is Mine" by the film's star Ice Cube, and "Ghetto Smile" by B-Legit. "The World Is Mine" made it to number 55 on the Hot R&B/Hip-Hop Songs chart and number 39 on the Hot Rap Songs chart in the United States.

Track listing

Charts

Weekly charts

Year-end charts

References

External links

Thriller film soundtracks
Hip hop soundtracks
1997 soundtrack albums
Jive Records soundtracks
Albums produced by KRS-One
Albums produced by Irv Gotti
Albums produced by Pete Rock
Albums produced by Studio Ton
Albums produced by The Legendary Traxster
Gangsta rap soundtracks
Action film soundtracks